Lectures on Aesthetics (LA; , VÄ) is a compilation of notes from university lectures on aesthetics given by Georg Wilhelm Friedrich Hegel in Heidelberg in 1818 and in Berlin in 1820/21, 1823, 1826 and 1828/29. It was compiled in 1835 by his student Heinrich Gustav Hotho, using Hegel's own hand-written notes and notes his students took during the lectures, but Hotho's work may render some of Hegel's thought more systematic than Hegel's initial presentation.

Content
Hegel develops his account of art as a mode of absolute spirit that he calls "the beautiful ideal," which he defines most generally as Now when truth in this its external existence [Dasein] is present to consciousness immediately, and with the concept remains immediately in unity with its external appearance, the Idea is not only true but beautiful. Beauty is determined as the sensible shining of the Idea.     This ideal is developed throughout the Lectures in accordance to Hegel's Logic:
The first universal part is devoted to the concept of the artistic ideal.
The second particular part examines this ideal as it actualizes itself in three stages:
Symbolic art, understood to encompass everything before Classical Greek art
Classical art
Romantic art, understood to emerge with the advent of Christianity on the world stage
The third singular part concerns itself with an examination of each of the five major arts in ascending order of "inwardness":
architecture
sculpture
painting
music
poetry

In these second two parts of the Lectures, Hegel documents the development of art from the paradigmatically symbolic architecture to the paradigmatically classical sculpture to the romantic arts of painting, music, and poetry. At the time it was noted for the wealth of pictures included with it.

Contrary to once-common belief, Hegel nowhere declares art to be "dead." What he says, in a representative statement is, "For us art counts no longer as the highest mode in which truth procures existence for itself." He speaks frequently of its "dissolution" [Auflösung], not its end [Ende], despite Hotho's use of the latter for the heading of the final moment of the Romantic art form.

Transcripts

Lydia Moland states that understanding Hegel's theory of aesthetics presents a significant challenge with Hegel scholarship due to the nature of the surviving materials on Aesthetics. Although Hegel lectured on art several times , he died before he was able to publish the handbook that he intended to use to accompany the lectures, and outside of the Phenomenology he only published a brief section in the Encyclopedia. After his death, one of his former Berlin students Heinrich Gustav Hotho, gathered the lecture notes that Hegel had intended to adapt for publication and combined them with a significant number of student notes. While this work has been the standard text for almost 200 years, more recent studies by Annemarie Gethmann-Siefert have shown that there is a significant amount of material in Hotho's text that is not represented in the student notes, and it is unclear how much of the material is originally based on manuscripts that have been lost. Additionally, the student notes show that Hegel's views on aesthetics evolved over time, while Hotho's text only presents a compiled, synthesized version of Hegel's thought.

A possible solution to these interpretative problems will come from the discovery in 2022 made by Hegel's biographer Klaus Vieweg. More than 4,000 pages of notes from Hegel's lectures at the Heidelberg University have been discovered in the library of the Archdiocese of Munich and Freising. These notes mainly deal with aesthetics and were written by Friedrich Wilhelm Carové between 1816 and 1818. Vieweg argues that this material will help scholars resolve the issue relating to the authenticity of Hotho's transcriptions, which are so far the only source on Hegelian aesthetics. These new notes are the only ones available dating back to Hegel's teaching period in Heidelberg and will be of absolute use in reconstructing the genesis of Hegelian thought on art and its relationship with religion and philosophy in general.

Influence
Hegel's Aesthetics is regarded by many as one of the greatest aesthetic theories to have been produced since Aristotle. Hegel's thesis about the historical dissolution of art has been the subject of much scholarly debate and influenced such thinkers like Theodor W. Adorno, Martin Heidegger, György Lukács, Jacques Derrida and Arthur Danto. Hegel was himself influenced by Johann Joachim Winckelmann, Immanuel Kant, Friedrich Schiller and Friedrich Wilhelm Joseph Schelling. Heidegger calls Hegel's Lectures on Aesthetics "the most comprehensive reflection on the essence of art that the West possesses".

Notes

References

Bibliography

Lecture Trancripts
 Vorlesung über Ästhetik. Berlin 1820/21. Eine Nachschrift, ed. H. Schneider. Frankfurt am Main: Peter Lang, 1995.
 Vorlesungen über die Philosophie der Kunst, ed. A. Gethmann-Siefert. Hamburg: Felix Meiner Verlag, 2003.
 Philosophie der Kunst oder Ästhetik. Nach Hegel. Im Sommer 1826. Mitschrift Friedrich Carl Hermann Victor von Kehler, eds. A. Gethmann-Siefert and B. Collenberg-Plotnikov. Munich: Wilhelm Fink Verlag, 2004.
 Philosophie der Kunst. Vorlesung von 1826, eds. A Gethmann-Siefert, J.-I. Kwon and K. Berr. Frankfurt am Main: Suhrkamp Verlag, 2004.

Translations

Sources
 Houlgate, Stephen (ed.), 2007, Hegel and the Arts. Evanston, Ill.: Northwestern University Press.

Further reading
 Adorno, Theodor W., 2004, Aesthetic Theory, Continuum International Publishing Group.
 Bungay, Stephen, 1984, Beauty and Truth. A Study of Hegel's Aesthetics. Oxford: Oxford University Press.
 Danto, Arthur Coleman, 1986. The Philosophical Disenfranchisement of Art. Columbia University Press.
 Danto, Arthur C., 1998, After the End of Art, Princeton University Press.
 Derrida, Jacques, 1987, The Truth in Painting, trans. Geoffrey Bennington & Ian McLeod. Chicago & London: Chicago University Press.
 Desmond, William, 1986, Art and the Absolute. A Study of Hegel's Aesthetics. Albany: SUNY Press.
 Gethmann-Siefert, Annemarie, 1984, Die Funktion der Kunst in der Geschichte. Untersuchungen zu Hegels Ästhetik. Bonn: Bouvier (in German language).
 Gethmann-Siefert, Annemarie, Einführung in Hegel's Ästhetik, Wilhelm Fink (German).
 Geulen, Eva, 2006, The End of Art. Readings in a Rumor after Hegel, trans. J. McFarland. Stanford: Stanford University Press.
 Lukács, György, 2002, Hegel's Aesthetics, Graduate Faculty Philosophy Journal, vol. 23, Nr 2, 87-124.
 Maker, W. (ed.), 2000. Hegel and Aesthetics. New York.
 Olivier, Alain P., 2003. Hegel et la Musique. Paris (French).
 Pippin, Robert, 2009. "The Absence of Aesthetics in Hegel’s Aesthetics", The Cambridge Companion to Hegel and Nineteenth-Century Philosophy , New York .
 Roche, Mark-William, 1998. Tragedy and Comedy. A Systematic Study and a Critique of Hegel. Albany. New York.

 Wyss, Beat, 1999, Hegel's Art History and the Critique of Modernity. Cambridge: Cambridge University Press.
 Winfield, Richard Dien, 1996. Stylistics. Rethinking the Artforms after Hegel. Albany, Suny Press.

External links
 Hegel’s Lectures on Aesthetics web version of Selections from Hegel's Lectures on Aesthetics, by Bernard Bosanquet & W.M. Bryant, "The Journal of Speculative Philosophy", 1886; published by Marxists Internet Archive
  German text in .pdf format.

1835 documents
Aesthetics literature
Works by Georg Wilhelm Friedrich Hegel